Trude Hesterberg (2 May 1892 – 31 August 1967) was a German film actress. She appeared in 89 films between 1917 and 1964.

Selected filmography

 The Rosentopf Case (1918)
 The Story of a Maid (1921)
 Fridericus Rex (1922)
 The Woman with That Certain Something (1925)
 Upstairs and Downstairs (1925)
 Circus Romanelli (1926)
 Maytime (1926)
 White Slave Traffic (1926)
 Madame Wants No Children (1926)
 The Queen Was in the Parlour (1927)
 The Vice of Humanity (1927)
 The Lorelei (1927)
 The Imaginary Baron (1927)
 Two Under the Stars (1927)
 Two Red Roses (1928)
 Honeymoon (1928)
 Strauss Is Playing Today (1928)
  When the Mother and the Daughter (1928)
 The Great Adventuress (1928)
 The Little Slave (1928)
 Revolt in the Batchelor's House (1929)
 The Convict from Istanbul (1929)
 Poor as a Church Mouse (1931)
 The Night of Decision (1931)
 Storms of Passion (1932)
 Viennese Waltz (1932)
 A Blonde Dream (1932)
 The Naked Truth (1932)
 The Page from the Dalmasse Hotel (1933)
 My Heart Calls You (1934)
 The Brenken Case (1934)
The Green Domino (1935)
 All Because of the Dog (1935)
 The Abduction of the Sabine Women (1936)
 Paul and Pauline (1936)
 Orders Are Orders (1936)
 His Best Friend (1937)
 The Irresistible Man (1937)
 The Blue Straw Hat (1949)
  Trouble in Paradise (1950)
 Alraune (1952)
 The Divorcée (1953)
 Jonny Saves Nebrador (1953)
 The Gypsy Baron (1954)
 The Old Forester House (1956)
 Sand, Love and Salt (1957)
 Doctor Bertram (1957)
 At the Green Cockatoo by Night (1957)

References

External links

1892 births
1967 deaths
German film actresses
German silent film actresses
20th-century German actresses
Actresses from Berlin